Barry Alan Davis (born September 17, 1961) is an Olympic silver medalist, a World bronze and silver medalist, and a Pan American Games gold medalist in freestyle wrestling. From 1994 until 2018, he served as head wrestling coach at the University of Wisconsin.

Early life 
Davis was born in Bloomfield, Iowa to Elmer and Carol Davis, and grew up in Cedar Rapids, Iowa.  He credits the support and work ethic of his parents as contributing to his drive to succeed in athletics.  Davis attended Cedar Rapids Prairie High School, where he was a three-time state wrestling champion (the second individual from the Cedar Rapids metro area to achieve that distinction), and earned a career prep record of 102-6-1.

College career 
At the University of Iowa, Davis wrestled on coach Dan Gable's team. During his college career, Davis was a four time NCAA Division I All-American, and a three-time NCAA Division I National Champion .  He was named NCAA Outstanding Wrestler in 1985, and was also named the Big Ten Athlete of the Year that same year.  Barry Davis' career record at Iowa was 162-9-1. As of 2020, he continues to hold University of Iowa records for season victories (46 in 1982), and career victories (162).

International competition 
Davis was champion in freestyle wrestling (125.4 lb) at the 1983 Pan American Games, and a member of the 1983 U.S. World wrestling team.  In 1984, he took a redshirt year from college athletics, to compete on the 1984 U.S. Olympic freestyle wrestling team, winning a silver medal at the Summer Olympics in Los Angeles.  Davis competed in the World championships again in 1986 and 1987, earning a bronze medal and a silver, respectively.  In 1988 he was once more a member of the U.S. Olympic freestyle wrestling team, but did not earn a medal.

Coaching career 
Barry Davis served as graduate assistant coach at the University of Iowa from 1986–1987, and was an assistant coach from 1988–1992.  In 1992, he attempted a to make his third U.S. Olympic team, but did not achieve a place on the team.  Davis had been head wrestling coach at the University of Wisconsin since 1994.  On March 5, 2018, Davis announced that he would resign as head coach of the Wisconsin Badgers at the end of the 2017-18 season.

Davis married Nan Doak in 1986. Nan also attended University of Iowa where she was a six-time All-American in track and field and cross country prior to becoming a United States national champion in the marathon.

Athletic achievements
 Three time Iowa state high school champion in wrestling
 1982 NCAA Division I Champion, 118 lb class
 Two-time NCAA Division I Champion, 126 lb class (1983, 1985)
 1983 Pan American Games champion, freestyle, 125.4 lb
 1983 Member of U.S. World wrestling team
 Four-time NCAA Division I All-American
 1984 Olympic silver medalist, 125.5 lb
 1985 Big Ten Athlete of the Year
 1985 NCAA Championships Outstanding Wrestler
 1986 World championship bronze medalist, 125.4 lb
 1987 World championship silver medalist, 125.4 lb
 1988 Member of U.S. Olympic freestyle wrestling team

Recognition 
 Davis is a member of the National Iowa Varsity Club's Athletic Hall of Fame, inducted in 1998.
 In 2007, Davis was inducted into the National Wrestling Hall of Fame as a Distinguished Member.

See also 
 Iowa Hawkeyes wrestling

Sources

References

External links
 
 Barry Davis at databaseOlympics.com
 Nan Doak-Davis and Barry Davis article from the Des Moines register
 

Olympic silver medalists for the United States in wrestling
Wrestlers at the 1984 Summer Olympics
Wrestlers at the 1988 Summer Olympics
American male sport wrestlers
Iowa Hawkeyes wrestlers
Sportspeople from Cedar Rapids, Iowa
1961 births
Living people
World Wrestling Championships medalists
Medalists at the 1984 Summer Olympics
Pan American Games medalists in wrestling
Pan American Games gold medalists for the United States
Wrestlers at the 1983 Pan American Games
Big Ten Athlete of the Year winners
Medalists at the 1983 Pan American Games
20th-century American people